Igor Vladimirovich Gorbunov (born 20 September 1994) is a Russian football player. He plays for FC Rubin Kazan. He is mostly deployed as a left midfielder, but also plays as winger, right midfielder or attacking midfielder.

Club career
He made his debut in the Russian Professional Football League for FC Dynamo Saint Petersburg on 20 July 2015 in a game against FC Khimki.

He made his Russian Football National League debut for FC Olimpiyets Nizhny Novgorod on 8 July 2017 in a game against FC Avangard Kursk.

He made his Russian Premier League debut for FC Nizhny Novgorod on 26 July 2021 in a game against his former club PFC Sochi. He substituted Albert Sharipov in the 68th minute and scored a goal less than a minute later. This was Nizhny Novgorod's first ever game in the RPL, so it was also the club's first ever goal in the top tier. The game finished with the score of 1–0, giving the club its first victory in the top tier as well.

On 28 July 2022, Gorbunov signed a two-year contract with FC Rubin Kazan.

Honours
 Russian Professional Football League Zone Ural-Povolzhye top scorer: 2016–17.

Career statistics

References

External links
 
 
 Profile by Russian Professional Football League

1994 births
Sportspeople from Tambov Oblast
Living people
Russian footballers
Association football midfielders
Russia youth international footballers
FC Dynamo Moscow reserves players
FC Dynamo Saint Petersburg players
FC Nizhny Novgorod (2015) players
PFC Sochi players
FC Rotor Volgograd players
FC Armavir players
FC Rubin Kazan players
Russian Premier League players
Russian First League players
Russian Second League players